Adrian Christopher Roos is a South African politician and a Member of Parliament in the National Assembly for the Democratic Alliance party. He is currently the Shadow Deputy Minister of Home Affairs.

Background
Roos holds LLB and BSc degrees and is an admitted advocate of the North Gauteng High Court. He is a former national chairperson of the Geoinformatics Society of South Africa. During his time as a Democratic Alliance PR councillor in the City of Tshwane Metropolitan Municipality, he was a member of the municipal public accounts, finance, economic development, transport and environment committees.  Roos was also elected to the regional executive of the DA in Gauteng North.

Parliamentary career
Roos was placed 25th on the DA's Gauteng regional list and 83rd on the party's national list for the 8 May 2019 National Assembly election. At the election, he won a seat in the National Assembly. Roos was sworn in as a Member of Parliament on 22 May, two weeks after the election. On 27 June 2019, he became an alternate member of the Portfolio Committee on Home Affairs. He became a full member of the committee on 7 February 2020 and was appointed Shadow Deputy Minister of Home Affairs.

On 5 December 2020, Roos was reappointed as Shadow Deputy Minister of Home Affairs by John Steenhuisen.

References

External links
Mr Adrian Christopher Roos at Parliament of South Africa

Living people
Year of birth missing (living people)
Place of birth missing (living people)
People from Gauteng
Afrikaner people
Democratic Alliance (South Africa) politicians
Members of the National Assembly of South Africa